The Chinese Communist Party (CCP) has a special role in lawmaking in the People's Republic of China, which has fluctuated over time. The role of the Party in lawmaking increased once Xi Jinping became General Secretary of the Chinese Communist Party. Through a variety of documents circulated within the Party, the CCP practically provides guidance to China's lawmaking organs such as the Standing Committee of the National People's Congress in the lawmaking process. Besides, the CCP itself assumes a role in setting internal norms (such as disciplinary rules for its Party members). There are several milestone Party documents that illustrate the CCP's leading role in China's lawmaking activities. They are:

 Report Submitted by Comrade Peng Zhen on the Examination and Approval Process of Making and Revising Laws and Regulations (issued by the General Office of the Central Committee of the CCP in August 1979);
 Several Opinions on Intensifying the Leadership of the Legislation Work of the State (issued by the Central Committee of the CCP in February 1991);
 Opinions on Strengthening the Work of the Party's Leadership in Lawmaking (February 2016).

The guidelines enshrined in these Party documents have had profound impacts on the lawmaking activities in the People's Republic of China.

See also 

 Law of the People's Republic of China

References

Communism in China
Law in Asia